Beraeodes is a genus of caddisflies belonging to the family Beraeidae.

The genus was first described by Eaton in 1867.

The species of this genus are found in Europe.

Species:
 Beraeodes minutus (Linnaeus, 1761)

References

Integripalpia
Trichoptera genera